Cover Me is a compilation album of songs written by Bruce Springsteen and performed by various artists. It includes both well known renditions and obscure covers of Springsteen compositions. It was released on vinyl in 1986 and re-released on compact disc in 1989 with two additional tracks by Greg Kihn. The CD version also substituted The Pointer Sisters' version of "Fire" for the Robert Gordon version.

Vinyl Track listing
All songs written by Bruce Springsteen, except where noted.

CD Track listing

References

1986 compilation albums
1989 compilation albums
Rhino Records compilation albums
Rock compilation albums
Bruce Springsteen tribute albums